The 1989 2. divisjon was a Norwegian second-tier football league season.

The league was contested by 24 teams, divided into two groups; A and B. The winners of group A and B were promoted to the 1990 Tippeligaen. The second placed teams met the 10th position finisher in the 1. divisjon in a qualification round where the winner was promoted to Tippeligaen. The bottom three teams inn both groups were relegated to the 3. divisjon.

Overview

Summary
Fyllingen won group A with 43 points and Strømsgodset won group B with 45 points. Both teams promoted to the 1990 Tippeligaen. The second-placed teams, Djerv 1919 and HamKam met Vålerengen in the promotion play-offs. Vålerengen won the qualification and remained in the Tippeligaen.

Tables

Group A

Group B

Promotion play-offs

Results
 15 October 1989: Vålerengen – Djerv 1919 1–0
 18 October 1989: Djerv 1919 – HamKam 2–0
 21 October 1989: HamKam – Vålerengen 2–2

Vålerengen won the qualification round and remained in the Tippeligaen.

Play-off table

References

Norwegian First Division seasons
1989 in Norwegian football
Norway
Norway